The 2009–10 CWHL season was the third season in the history of the Canadian Women's Hockey League.  the Montreal Stars repeated as regular season champions for the third straight year. Sabrina Harbec of the Stars won the Angela James Bowl as the top scorer and was voted the league's most valuable player, the CWHL Top Forward and a CWHL First Team All-Star. Teammate Annie Guay was voted CWHL Top Defender while Laura Hosier was voted CWHL Top Goaltender. Danielle Blanchard was voted CWHL Outstanding Rookie.

Exhibition games
The CWHL participated in a number of benefit games against NHL Alumni. Games were played on March 4 (Galt Street Arena, Cambridge), March 5 (Mountain Arena, Hamilton), March 6 (Hershey Centre, Mississauga) and March 7 (Niagara Falls Memorial Arena).

Regular season
During the season, Ashley Johnston of the Burlington Barracudas was the youngest Ontario player to play in the CWHL.

Final standings
Note: GP = Games played, W = Wins, L = Losses, OTL = Overtime Losses, SOL = Shootout Losses, GF = Goals for, GA = Goals against, Pts = Points.

Statistical leaders

Points (Angela James Bowl)

Stats do not include the Dec. 13, 2009 Mississauga-Vaughan game

Goals

Assists

Penalty Minutes

Awards and honours

 Most Valuable Player: Sabrina Harbec, Montreal
 Angela James Bowl: Top Scorer Sabrina Harbec, Montreal
 Outstanding Rookie: Danielle Blanchard, Vaughan

CWHL Top Players
 Top Forward: Sabrina Harbec, Montreal
 Top Defender: Annie Guay, Montreal
 Top Goaltender: Laura Hosier, Brampton

CWHL All-Stars
First Team All-Stars
 Goalie Laura Hosier, Brampton
 Defence Annie Guay, Montreal - unanimous
 Defence Michelle Bonello, Vaughan
 Forward Sabrina Harbec, Montreal - unanimous
 Forward Lindsay Vine, Burlington
 Forward Sommer West, Mississauga
Second Team All-Stars
 Goalie Sami Jo Small, Mississauga
 Defence Shannon Moulson, Mississauga
 Defence Bobbi Jo Slusar, Brampton
 Forward Noémie Marin, Montreal
 Forward Lori Dupuis, Brampton
 Forward Jana Harrigan, Burlington

CWHL All-Rookie Team
 Goalie Allison Cubberley, Burlington
 Defence Ashley Johnston, Burlington
 Defence Sharon Kelly, Ottawa
 Forward Danielle Blanchard, Vaughan
 Forward Donna Ringrose, Montreal
 Forward Nicole Tritter, Brampton

Monthly Top Scorers
 October: Christin Powers, Ottawa (6+6=12 points, 8 games)
 November: Sabrina Harbec, Montreal (6+18=24 points, 9 games)
 December: Sabrina Harbec, Montreal (3+7=10 points, 5 games)
 January: Lori Dupuis, Brampton (8+7=15 points, 9 games)
 February: Brianne Jenner, Burlington (4+3=7 points, 4 games)
 March: Nicole Tritter, Brampton (2+3=5 points, 3 games)

Playoffs
The Montreal Stars and Mississauga Chiefs qualified for the Clarkson Cup as they were the top two teams in the league. The four remaining teams competed in an elimination tournament. The winning team was the final team from the CWHL to qualify for the Clarkson Cup.

Clarkson Cup
On March 3, 2010, the city council of Richmond Hill, Ontario donated $10,000 to the CWHL so that it could host the Clarkson Cup on March 27 and 28 at the Elgin Barrow Arena in Richmond Hill.

Semifinals

Finals

Minnesota Whitecaps (WWHL) won the Clarkson Cup.

See also
 Canadian Women's Hockey League
 Clarkson Cup
 2010 Clarkson Cup

References

 
CWHL